Capromimus abbreviatus, the capro dory, is a species of zeniontid fish, the only species in the genus Capromimus, found around New Zealand only,  at depths of between .  It grows to a length of  TL.

References
 
 
 Tony Ayling & Geoffrey Cox, Collins Guide to the Sea Fishes of New Zealand,  (William Collins Publishers Ltd, Auckland, New Zealand 1982) 

Zeniontidae
Endemic marine fish of New Zealand
Monotypic fish genera
Fish described in 1875